Aura Celina Casanova was a Venezuelan politician, the first woman in Venezuela to be appointed to the Cabinet.

Career 
In 1968 President Raúl Leoni appointed her Minister of Economic Development, a position she held until 1969. She was succeeded by Luis Enrique Oberto.

References

Year of birth missing
Possibly living people
Women government ministers of Venezuela
20th-century Venezuelan women politicians
20th-century Venezuelan politicians